Mentor is an unincorporated community in Garfield County, in the U.S. state of Washington.

The community was named after Mentor, Ohio.

References

Unincorporated communities in Garfield County, Washington
Unincorporated communities in Washington (state)